Erik Karl Hilding Wistrand (1907 – 2 October 1998) was a Swedish Latinist.

References

External links 
http://worldcat.org/search?q=au=%22Wistrand,%20Erik%22

1907 births
1998 deaths
Swedish classical scholars